Akademik Tryoshnikov is  a Russian scientific diesel-electric research vessel, the flagship of the Russian polar research fleet.

History 

The vessel was constructed under the state order.
The project was developed by Krylov Shipbuilding Research Institute with Baltsudoproekt Bureau. Chief designer of the project was - Yevgueny S. Bylinovich.

The creation of the vessel became an event for the Russian Polar science, since the previous research vessel had been put into operation 25 years ago.

The ship is named in honor of Alexey Tryoshnikov, who was the president of the Geographical Society of the USSR since 1977.

In October 2016, the ship was used to test towing icebergs in the Kara Sea.

Between December 2016 and March 2017, the Akademik Tryoshnikov was used for the Antarctic Circumnavigation Expedition(ACE) during the Southern Hemisphere summer.

References

Research vessels of Russia
Ships built at Admiralty Shipyard
Arctic exploration vessels
2011 ships